Cueras (or Santa Eulalia de Cueras) is one of 54 parishes in Cangas del Narcea, a municipality within the province and autonomous community of Asturias, in northern Spain.

Villages
 Arayón
 Cueiras
 El Ḷḷanu
 Santolaya
 Santuyanu

References

Parishes in Cangas del Narcea